Daniel A. Reed is a computer scientist who is the provost of the University of Utah. He is current Chair of the National Science Board and was previously vice-president for research at the University of Iowa.

References

Scientific computing researchers
Microsoft employees
Purdue University alumni
Living people
University of Utah faculty
Year of birth missing (living people)